Mladen Vujić (born 14 August 1998) is a Serbian professional basketball player for Podgorica of the Prva A Liga and the ABA League Second Division.

Playing career 
Vujić played for his hometown teams Žarkovo and OKK Beograd, as well as Novi Sad-based Vojvodina.

On 17 June 2021, Vujić signed a contract with Mega Basket. On 15 June 2022, Vujić signed a contract for Podgorica.

References

External links 
 Player Profile at eurobasket.com
 Player Profile at realgm.com
 Player Profile at aba-liga.com

1998 births
Living people
ABA League players
Basketball League of Serbia players
Basketball players from Belgrade
KK Mega Basket players
KK Vojvodina players
KK Podgorica players
KK Žarkovo players
OKK Beograd players
Serbian expatriate basketball people in Montenegro
Serbian men's basketball players